Kinesin-like protein KIF22 is a protein that in humans is encoded by the KIF22 gene.

The protein encoded by this gene is a member of kinesin-like protein family. This family of proteins are microtubule-dependent molecular motors that transport organelles within cells and move chromosomes during cell division. The C-terminal half of this protein has been shown to bind DNA. Studies with the Xenopus homolog suggests an essential role in metaphase chromosome alignment and maintenance.

Interactions
KIF22 has been shown to interact with SIAH1.

Clinical relevance
Mutations in this gene have been shown to cause developmental disorders such as Spondyloepimetaphyseal dysplasia with joint laxity.

References

Further reading